In 1495 one-third of the population of the town of Martina Franca, Italy, was made of practising Jews or Jews converted to Christianity. The escape involved one-third of the population: 150–200 families (at least one thousand people). Among the privileges granted the city council of Martina in 1495, King Frederick of Aragon forbade Jews and Crypto-Jews and Neofiti to press charges against those who robbed them (probably during the riots of 1494–1495 during the French invasion of the Kingdom of Naples) and prohibited their coming to live in that city. Also in 1495, the Jews of Martina Franca were massacred.

Traces of the Jews: synagogue, neighborhood and cemetery

The area where the Jews used to live is the one between "u'Curdunnidde" and Vico Montedoro (this is a Jewish name, present also in Taranto and Naples). Before the anti-Semite laws (1938), the population called that area Giudecca (the Jewish quarter). There was a synagogue at the foot of Montedoro; it might be the present cloister of St. Dominic. The Jewish cemetery was outside the walls. Perhaps the cloister of St. Anthony is all that is left.

Bibliography
   A. Lanucara, Gli Ebrei a Martina La voce del cittadino Dicembre 1993 -ANNO III- N. 5-12 (inserto)
   C. Colafemmina, Gli ebrei a Taranto (2005)
   C. Colafemmina, Ebrei e cristiani novelli in Puglia. Le comunità minori (1991)
   N. Ferorelli, Gli Ebrei nell’Italia meridionale, dall’età romana al secolo XVIII in una nota a pagina 98
   I. Chirulli, Istoria cronologica della Franca Martina, cogli avvenimenti più notabili del regno di Napoli
   Angelantonio Giannuzzi, Le carte di Altamura (1232–1502), Bari, Tip. Vecchi, 1935, p. 473 nota 2, documento 316
   C. Cafforio,  Una colonia ebraica nella Lama del Fullonese in Voce del popolo di Taranto, A. 53,N. 29, del 18 luglio 1936, p. 2

Martina Franca
Jewish Italian history